The 2013 FIFA Beach Soccer World Cup was the seventh edition of the FIFA Beach Soccer World Cup. Overall, this was the 17th edition of a world cup in beach soccer since the establishment of the Beach Soccer World Championships which ran from 1995–2004 but was not governed by FIFA. It took place from 18–28 September 2013 at Tahua To'ata Stadium (Stade Tahua To'ata) in Papeete, Tahiti, French Polynesia and was the fourth tournament to have taken place outside Brazil. This was the second tournament to take place since the establishment of a longer two-year cycle of tournaments. This was also the first FIFA tournament held in a Pacific country other than New Zealand, and the first senior FIFA tournament took place in the region.

The tournament was confirmed in March 2010. Russia successfully defended their title.

Qualifying rounds

Hosts
Tahiti qualified automatically as hosts.

African Zone

The CAF qualifiers took place from 22–26 May 2013 in El Jadida, Morocco to determine the two teams for the finals. The qualifiers were originally scheduled for 10–14 April, and then 29 May-2 June 2013 in Casablanca. Senegal and Ivory Coast qualified for the two available spots.

Asian Zone

The AFC qualifiers took place from 22–26 January 2013 at a temporary stadium and adjacent pitch on the Katara Beach in Doha, Qatar, to determine the three teams to qualify for the finals. Iran, Japan and the United Arab Emirates took the three spots.

European Zone

The UEFA qualifiers took place in Moscow, Russia on 1–8 July 2012. Spain, Russia, Ukraine and the Netherlands grabbed the four available spots.

North, Central American and Caribbean Zone

The CONCACAF qualifiers took place from 8–12 May 2013 in Nassau, Bahamas to determine the two spots available. The United States, and El Salvador claimed the two spots.

Oceanian Zone

The OFC qualifiers took place from 30 August to 2 September 2013 on the grounds of the University of New Caledonia in Nouméa, New Caledonia to determine the second OFC team to qualify for the FIFA Beach Soccer World Cup (Tahiti having already qualified as hosts). They were originally to have taken place from 4–9 August 2013 in the 2013 FIFA Beach Soccer World Cup's host city of Papeete, Tahiti. Due to difficulties with the dimensions of the pitch that was to be used for the qualifiers, and Tahiti's declined not to participate in the tournament, it was decided that the tournament should be moved to reduce costs. It was originally scheduled for 12–14 June.

South American Zone

The CONMEBOL qualifiers took place from 10–17 February 2013 at a temporary stadium in Merlo, a town in the San Luis Province of Argentina, to determine the three spots available. Argentina, Brazil and Paraguay claimed the three spots.

Teams
The allocation of slots for this competition was approved by the FIFA Executive Committee in May 2012.

These are the teams that qualified for the World Cup:

Asian zone (AFC)

African zone (CAF)

European zone (UEFA)
 
 
 
 

North, Central American and Caribbean zone (CONCACAF)
 
 
Oceanian zone (OFC)
 
 (hosts)
South American zone (CONMEBOL)

Venue
All matches were played at the Tahua To'ata Stadium in Papeete.

Match ball
All matches were played using the new Adidas Cafusa match ball; this version was slightly-modified from the match ball used at the 2013 FIFA Confederations Cup.

Official song
Tu'e Popo' by Sabrina was the official song of the tournament, and the video features the island rhythms of the host country and the city of Papeete.

Referees
FIFA chose 24 officials to referee the matches at the World Cup. From the 24 referees, at least one referee representing each confederation; four from the AFC, three from CAF, five from CONMEBOL, three from CONCACAF, one from the OFC and eight from UEFA, with all 24 officials being from different countries. The referees were revealed in July 2013.

Draw
The final draw was held on 5 June 2013 at 19:30 (local time) at the Maison de la Culture (Te Fare Tauhiti Nui) in Papeete, Tahiti. The hosts, Tahiti, and the defending champions, Russia, were assigned to positions A1 and D1 prior to the draw. Teams from the same confederation could not be drawn against each other at the group stage.

Note: At the time the draw was conducted, the OFC qualifier was not yet known.

Squads

Teams must name a 12-man squad (two of whom must be goalkeepers) by the FIFA deadline. The squads were announced by FIFA on 11 September 2013.

Group stage
Each team earns three points for a win, two points for a win in extra time or a penalty shoot-out, and no points for a defeat.

Tie-breaking criteria
Where two or more teams end the group stage with the same number of points, their ranking is determined by the following criteria:

 greatest number of points obtained in the group matches between the teams concerned;
 greatest goal difference resulting from the group matches between the teams concerned;
 greatest number of goals scored in all group matches between the teams concerned;
 greatest goal difference in all group matches;
 greatest number of goals scored in all group matches;
 drawing of lots by the FIFA Organising Committee.

''All times are local, UTC−10:00.

Group A

Group B

Group C

Note: Iran, Ukraine and Senegal are ranked by their head-to-head results.

Group D

Knockout stage

Quarter finals

Semi-finals

Third place play-off

Final

Winners

Awards

Top scorers

Final standings

References

External links
FIFA Beach Soccer World Cup Tahiti 2013 , FIFA.com
FIFA Beach Soccer World Cup Tahiti 2013, Beach Soccer Worldwide
FIFA Technical Report

 
2013

FIFA Beach Soccer World Cup
FIFA Beach Soccer World Cup
2013 Fifa Beach Soccer World Cup